Kretschmar is a German occupational surname literally meaning "innkeeper" associated with the term  for village inn. It comes from Middle High German kretschmar, which was borrowed from a Slavic language, e.g. Czech krčmář. Other forms include Kretschmer, Kretzschmar, and Kreczmar (Polonized form).

Notable people with the surname include:

Gerhard Kretschmar (1939–1939), German eugenics victim
Helmut Kretschmar (born 1928), German classical tenor 
William Kretschmar (1933–2017), American politician

References

German-language surnames
Surnames of Slavic origin
Occupational surnames